La Rosa de Guadalupe (English title: The Rose of Guadalupe) is a Mexican anthology drama television series created by Carlos Mercado Orduña and produced by Miguel Ángel Herros. The series centers on Mexican Catholic religiosity, specifically to the Virgin of Guadalupe. It is set in modern times, most often in Mexico City, but location varies in some episodes. The series premiered on Las Estrellas on February 5, 2008. In the United States, the series debuted on Univision on June 26, 2008.

Plot 
There are two types of beginnings for the episodes: a happy beginning, or a more melodramatic one where the main character undergoes a calamitous event that kickstarts their development. In the latter, the editor, cast, and director's credits roll during the second scene.

Main characters, portrayed as extremely devout to the Virgin of Guadalupe, almost always ask her to protect them. At the same time, a white rose appears before an altar or statue of the Virgin that belongs to the person who prayed or is in trouble, and remains there during the development of the story, which usually sees an escalation of the problem. The rose's appearance means that the petition has been heard by the Virgin.

At the climax of the story, the closest person asked by the Virgin intercedes for the main character and tries to help. When the issue is resolved, the main character is "touched" by a wind that represents the act of the Virgin of Guadalupe, and at the end of the episode, the white rose disappears as a character narrates the message of the episode.

History

"Las mil rosas" ("The Thousand Roses") 

On July 5, 2017, the series began its 1,000th episode celebration. Remastered versions of the earliest episodes from 2008 to 2016 were aired beginning July 10, 2017. On July 22, 2017, the 1,000th episode, "The Bastard Sister", was aired. Alejandra Barros and Alexis Ayala starred in the episode.

Impact stories 

Starting in May 2017, "La rosa de Guadalupe" began broadcasting episodes with more serious, social issue-driven "impact" stories on Saturdays at 9:30 pm. These stories featured more explicit topics such as rape, incest, sexual harassment, murder, and drug addiction. The content rating given to these Saturday night episodes is B-15, whereas the content rating of episodes broadcast during the business week is B.

Reception 
The series' features are a staple of modern Mexican television, due to its popularity among Catholics. Some have criticized the show since its first broadcasts for its poor acting, writing, and directing. Some reviewers have criticized the low-fidelity effects, as well as lack of research dealing with certain social groups and issues such as addiction, bullying, family violence and sexual abuse.

La rosa de Guadalupe has obtained a cult following online. The series is the subject of parody, internet memes, sketches of comedy programs, and appreciation among both Catholic media and "so bad it's good" fandoms.

Rivalry 
In 2009, a similar program, A cada quien su santo, began airing on TV Azteca; during an hour, a case in some regions of the country is presented praising the faith of a particular saint, while in Televisa, there are narrative cases about miracles performed by the Virgin of Guadalupe.

"Adiós Inocencia" controversial episode 
Adiós Inocencia (Goodbye Innocence) is an episode that was inspired by the El Campamento Colibrí attacks involving 12 people attacking 90 people, with 7 teens being sexually assaulted, tortured, and robbed. When a sneak peek of the episode was made on August 10th, 2012, parents of the victims complained about the airing, and the episode never aired. There are rumors that the episode aired on a later date around 2013 to 2014, but this hasn't been confirmed. Since the episode hasn't aired since and the only fragments revolving the episode that exist online are sneak peaks, the episode is considered lost.

Adaptations 
In August 2021, Romanian channel Antena 1 adapted the series as "Povești de familie", having the same anthologic format as the original.

References

External links
 

Mexican telenovelas
Televisa telenovelas
Television series by Televisa
2008 Mexican television series debuts
Film and television memes
Las Estrellas original programming
Mexican anthology television series
Spanish-language television shows
Religious controversies in television
Television shows about Catholicism
Television controversies in Mexico